Gnathoenia bialbata is a species of beetle in the family Cerambycidae. It was described by Fairmaire in 1891. It contains the varietas Gnathoenia bialbata var. latefasciata.

References

Ceroplesini
Beetles described in 1891